Komarikha is a rural locality (a selo) and the administrative center of Komarikhinsky Selsoviet of Shipunovsky District, Altai Krai, Russia. The population was 1,001 in 2017. There are 9 streets.

Geography 
Komarikha is located 53 km southeast of Shipunovo (the district's administrative centre) by road. Tugozvonovo is the nearest rural locality.

References 

Rural localities in Shipunovsky District